Erich Wolf is a former air force officer. He served as Commander of the Austrian Air Force from December 2002 to August 2006.

References 

Living people
Year of birth missing (living people)
Place of birth missing (living people)
Austrian aviators
Theresian Military Academy alumni